Pratylenchus coffeae is a plant-pathogenic nematode infecting several hosts including potato, banana, sweet potato, strawberry, Persian violet, peanut and citrus.

References

External links 
 Pratylenchus coffeae. Nemaplex. University of California, Davis.

coffeae
Plant pathogenic nematodes
Potato diseases
Banana diseases
Root vegetable diseases
Citrus pests
Nematodes described in 1951